The Archaeological Museum of Thebes is a museum in Thebes, Greece.

External links

Hellenic Ministry of Culture and Tourism
Archaeological Museum of Thebes - Ebook by Latsis Foundation

Thebes
Thebes, Greece